Forton is a civil parish in the Borough of Stafford, Staffordshire, England.  It contains eleven listed buildings that are recorded in the National Heritage List for England. Of these, three are at Grade II*, the middle of the three grades, and the others are at Grade II, the lowest grade.  The parish contains the village of Forton and the surrounding area, which includes Aqualate Park.  In the park is Aqualate Hall, a country house which is listed, together with other buildings in the park.  The other listed buildings are houses, a church, a bridge, and a structure which is either a folly or and ruined windmill.


Key

Buildings

References

Citations

Sources

Lists of listed buildings in Staffordshire